Turku Trojans is one of the oldest American football teams in Finland, established in 1982. Turku Trojans have played in the Maple League Vaahteraliiga (highest level) in Finland operated by American Football Association of Finland. Finnish champions in 2003. Maple Bowl championship game appearances in 1984, 1987, 1992, 1993, 1994, 1998, 1999, 2002, 2004 and 2014. Third place in 1991, 1997, 2000 and 2001. After the 2012 season the Trojans decided to voluntarily drop one level down and play the next season in 1st division (2nd tier league below Maple League). In 2013, the Trojans won all the regular season games, the semifinal game and the Spaghetti Bowl. After a perfect season the Trojans was granted a Maple League Vaahteraliiga license and this season (2014) the team will play again in the highest level.

Lineup

Roster 2014

References

External links
 Official site

Sport in Turku
American football teams in Finland
1982 establishments in Finland
American football teams established in 1982